Miscera homotona is a moth of the family Brachodidae first described by Charles Swinhoe in 1892. It is found in Australia.

Taxonomy
When first described, this species was included in the family Sesiidae. It was moved to the family Glyphipterigidae and finally to the Brachodidae.

External links
Image at CSIRO Entomology
Australian Faunal Directory
Classification of the Superfamily Sesioidea (Lepidoptera: Ditrysia)

Moths of Australia
Brachodidae
Moths described in 1892